The Chronicles of Marnia is the fourth album by Marnie Stern, released on March 19, 2013, on Kill Rock Stars.

Track listing
 "Year of the Glad" – 3:39
 "You Don't Turn Down" – 3:11
 "Noonan" – 3:09
 "Nothing Is Easy" – 3:48
 "Immortals" – 2:54
 "The Chronicles of Marnia" – 3:10
 "Still Moving" – 3:06
 "East Side Glory" – 2:55
 "Proof of Life" – 3:42
 "Hell Yes" – 3:17

Personnel
 Marnie Stern: vocals, guitar, keyboards
 Evan Jewett: guitar, keyboards, vocals
 Nithin Kalvakota: Bass, Guitar
 Kid Millions: Drums
 Nicolas Vernhes: Engineer, Producer

References

2013 albums
Marnie Stern albums
Kill Rock Stars albums